Frank William McDowell (19 March 1934 – 2 October 2003) was an Australian rules footballer who played with Footscray in the Victorian Football League (VFL).

Notes

External links 

1934 births
Australian rules footballers from Victoria (Australia)
Western Bulldogs players
Yarraville Football Club players
2003 deaths